This is a list of all personnel changes for the 2017 Indian Premier League.

Retained players 
The eight teams could retain and release players from their squad during the retention window which ended on 15 December 2016. The salaries of the released players would be added to the salary purse of 66 crore, while the salaries of the retained players was deducted from this purse. The list of retained and released players was made public on 19 December 2016.

Transfers
The first trading window was open in December 2016 while the second trading window was open from 13 to 20 January 2017.

The following transfers were made during the trading windows:

Auction
The players auction for the 2017 Indian Premier League was originally scheduled to be held in Bangalore on 4 February 2017, but was pushed forward by at least two weeks due to the BCCI–Lodha committee stand-off. On 3 February, the BCCI announced that the auction would be held on 20 February in Bangalore and that a total of 799 players have signed up for it.  On 14 February, the IPL Desk released a list of 351 players.

Sold players 
Out of the 351 players shortlisted, the following 66 players were sold at the 2017 IPL Auction:

Unsold players

 Alex Hales
 Faiz Fazal
 Ross Taylor
 Irfan Pathan
 Sean Abbott
 Ben Dunk
 Jonny Bairstow
 Andre Fletcher
 Johnson Charles
 Dinesh Chandimal
 Kyle Abbott
 Ishant Sharma
 Lakshan Sandakan
 Ish Sodhi
 Brad Hogg
 Pragyan Ojha
 Imran Tahir
 Umang Sharma
 Prithvi Shaw
 Unmukt Chand
 Asghar Afghan
 Mahipal Lomror
 Praveen Dubey
 Shivam Dube
 Manan Sharma
 Rush Kalaria
 Priyank Panchal
 Vishnu Vinod
 Shreevats Goswami
 Mohammad Shahzad
 Mohit Ahlawat
 Manvinder Bisla
 Abu Nechim Ahmed
 Umar Nazir
 Pawan Suyal
 Mayank Dagar
 Sarabjit Ladda
 Mitchell Swepson
 Akshay Wakhare
 Cheteshwar Pujara
 Abhinav Mukund
 Michael Klinger
 Subramaniam Badrinath
 Marlon Samuels
 Evin Lewis
 Nic Maddinson
 Parveez Rasool
 Jason Holder
 David Wiese
 Thisara Perera
 Farhaan Behardien
 Anamul Haque
 Shane Dowrich
 Kusal Perera
 Niroshan Dickwella
 Brad Haddin
 Glenn Phillips
 RP Singh
 Pankaj Singh
 Fawad Ahmed
 Michael Beer
 Akila Dananjaya
 Nathan Lyon
 Rahul Sharma
 Jonny Bairstow
 Himanshu Rana
 Apoorv Wankhade
 Akash Bhandari
 Akhil Herwadkar
 Pankaj Jaiswal
 Dishant Yagnik
 Rishi Arothe
 Ronsford Beaton
 Kanishk Seth
 Joe Burns
 Colin Munro
 James Neesham
 Wayne Parnell
 Mitchell Santner
 Harpreet Singh Bhatia
 Colin de Grandhomme
 Andile Phehlukwayo
 Dwaine Pretorius
 Ben Wheeler
 Kesrick Williams
 Tajendra Singh
 Virat Singh
 Manjeet Kumar Chaudhary
 Mehedi Hasan Miraz
 Sabbir Rahman
 Mahmudullah
 Baba Indrajith
 Amit Verma
 Himmat Singh
 Ashton Turner
 Chaitanya Bishnoi

Support staff changes
 In November 2016, Mahela Jayawardene was appointed head coach of the Mumbai Indians, replacing Ricky Ponting.
 In December 2016, Wasim Akram stepped down as the bowling coach and mentor of the Kolkata Knight Riders for the 2017 season, citing "professional commitments and time constraints."
 In December 2016, Sanjay Bangar stepped down as the head coach of Kings XI Punjab.
 In January 2017, Lakshmipathy Balaji was named bowling coach of the Kolkata Knight Riders.
 In January 2017, Virender Sehwag was named head of cricket operations and strategy of Kings XI Punjab.
 In February 2017, J. Arunkumar was named batting coach of Kings XI Punjab.
 In February 2017, Mohammad Kaif was named assistant coach of Gujarat Lions.

Withdrawn players
The following players withdrew from the tournament either due to injuries or because of other reasons.

References

External links

Indian Premier League personnel changes
2017 in Indian cricket